Coliseo Cerrado is an indoor sporting arena located in Cusco, Peru.  The capacity of the arena is 13,000 spectators  and has hosted some Peru women's national volleyball team matches.   It hosts indoor sporting events such as basketball, volleyball, and boxing.

References

Indoor arenas in Peru
Buildings and structures in Cusco